Trey Harrington (born November 26, 1970) is a former American soccer player who played for the Colorado Foxes in the A-League.

Career statistics

Club

Notes

References

1970 births
Living people
American soccer players
United States men's under-23 international soccer players
Association football goalkeepers
Wichita Wings players
Detroit Rockers players
Colorado Foxes players
National Professional Soccer League (1984–2001) players
A-League (1995–2004) players